Puran Das Baul, popularly known as Purna Das Baul Samrat, (born 18 March 1933) is an Indian musician and singer, in Baul tradition. The artist is sometimes cited as Purna Chandra Das, though 'Purna Das Baul' is used to avoid confusion with other artists and individuals with the same name. He has traveled in 140 countries, throughout the world and presented the Baul tradition.

Family and background
Purna Das Baul Samrat is perceived as the successor to the once wandering mendicant minstrels, the Bauls of Bengal, a historical territory which currently is divided between People's Republic of Bangladesh (previously East Bengal / East Pakistan) and the Indian state of West Bengal, and the neighbouring Indian states of Bihar, Assam and Orissa. Das is a traditional surname among Bauls as well as in other members of the populace in this region.

Born in 1933 in Birbhum district, West Bengal, India, Purna Das Baul Samrat is the son of Nabini Das Kapha Baul and was born in the village of Ekchakka near Rampurhat in Birbhum. Purna Das's wife Manju Das Baul is both a Baul and a singer of Indian and Bengali folk songs in other traditions, and also a musicographer, principally in non-English idioms. Of Purna Das's three sons, Krishnendu Das aka BabuKishan, Subhendu ("Beautiful Moon") Bapi Das Baul, is a musician who also works in the Baul tradition while concurrently extending his music into global fusion, having lived for many years in France. Purna Das Baul Samrat's son Dibyendu Das Baul joined Purna Das Baul Samrat in the Baul Samrat's musical and liturgical troupe. His oldest son, Krishnendu Das Baul, helped his father to travel to all continents, and is himself a Baul, currently living in Canada.

Dr. Rajendra Prasad, first President of the modern state of India, acknowledged Purna Das as Baul Samrat in 1967. In this capacity, Purna Das Baul Samrat was awarded the Indian President's Award by Shri K. R. Narayan, tenth President of India, in 1999.

Purna Das has also appeared in numerous films, and was personally fêted by Mick Jagger in England, and by Bob Dylan who told Purna Das that he himself would be 'the Baul of America'. Together with his student Selina Thielemann, he authored the first book on the philosophy of the Bauls to be published in English language. In 2019, he appeared in If Not for You, a documentary about Kolkata's long lasting love affair with legendary singer-songwriter Bob Dylan.

Performances
2013: Baul Samrat's troupe travelled Istanbul, Konya, Turkey.
2012: Baul Samrat's troupe travelled Seoul, South Korea.
2009: Baul Samrat's troupe travelled California, USA.
2006: Baul Samrat's Troupe travelled Shanghai, China.
2005: Baul Samrat'stroupe travelled USA.
2004: Baul Samrat's troupe travelled Australia: Adelaide.
2003: Baul Samrat's troupe toured in US and CA: New York, Washington DC, Texas, California, Ontario (Toronto), September to October
2003: Baul Samrat's troupe toured in US: Arizona, California (University of San Diego), April
2002: Baul Samrat's troupe worship services at World Jain Conference in Baroda, Gujrat, Islamic Republic of Pakistan, 5 December
2002: Baul Samrat's troupe toured in CA: Ontario (Toronto), Quebec (Montreal), October to November
2002: Baul Samrat's troupe toured in US: California (San Diego, at World Music Center of Los Angeles, San Francisco), July to September
2002: Baul Samrat's troupe toured in US: New York, for Baba Loke Nath Mission, June
2002: Baul Samrat's troupe toured in US: New York, Florida, Washington, California, Michigan for Abbasuddin's birth centennial, March to April
2001: Baul Samrat's troupe at FOBANA Festival, Montreal, Quebec, CA, September
2000: Baul Samrat's troupe toured in IT: Rome, at Romaposia poetry festival, October
1999: Baul Samrat's troupe travelled Luxembourg.
1998: Baul Samrat's troupe travelled Italy in Rome, Florence, Vatican City, Milan.
1997: Baul Samrat's troupe travelled Canada and to the USA. He performed at Symphony Space for the World Music Institute (4/19/97)
1996: Baul Samrat's troupe travelled USA.
1994: Baul Samrat's troupe travelled Belgium (Brussels) Germany (Berlin, Koln) Norway.
1992: Baul Samrat's troupe travelled Dublin, Ireland.
1990: Baul Samrat's troupe travelled Iran.
1987: Baul Samrat's troupe travelled with the "Rollingstones", to London, L.A., Berlin, Madrid.
1985: Baul Samrat's troupe travelled to USA and performed 2 concerts for the World Music Institute at Symphony Space, New York 
1981: Baul Samrat and Manju Das travelled to USA and performed 2 concerts at the Alternative Museum (Formerly ACIA, New York. At the first concert (10/31/81) he was joined by legendary jazz flutist Herbie Mann 
1979: Baul Samrat and Manju Das travelled to USA and performed 2 concerts at the Alternative Center for International Arts, New York. The first concert (3/31/79) was opened by poet Allen Ginsberg

English language discography and bibliography
Purna Chandra Das Baul: The Bengal Minstrel (Nonesuch, 1975)
Songs of the Madmen (Kali Mandir, 1990s–2000s), CD, live recordings of Kali Mandir liturgical songs during services and pujas, Laguna Beach, California, U.S.
Purna Das Baul & Manju Das: Bengali Folk Songs (Saregama, 1995-01-20), features Purna and Manju Das Baul.
The Bauls of Bengal (CramWorld, 1994), CD, which is included in the Rough Guide's World Music: 100 Essential CDs.
Spiritual Songs of India (Chhanda Dhara SP 9283), vinyl and cassette-only release, features Purna and Manju Das Baul.
Arohan (1983, motion picture directed by Shyam Benegal, starring Victor Banerjee, Noni Ganguly, Pankaj Kapur), composer

Honors
2013 Padma Shri
1999 Indian President's Award presented by Shri K. R. Narayan.
1988 Nadamani, Baul Samrat's collective, Jagannath Temple, Puri (Oriya: ବଡଦେଉଳ, ଶ୍ରୀମନ୍ଦିର), Puri, Orissa state, IN
1986 Nadabramha, Baul Samrat's troupe, Puri Bhajan Festival
1979 C.C.I., Baul Samrat's troupe, New Delhi, IN
1973 (circa) Gold Medal for Baul Samrat's troupe, Satya Saibaba in Bangalore/ Bengaluru (Kannada: ಬೆಂಗಳೂರು), Karnataka state, IN
1968, re-releases through 2004 or later, John Wesley Harding, album by Bob Dylan, featuring Purna Das on its cover, Purna Das working with Bob Dylan & The Band
1967 Dr Rajendra Prasad, President of India acknowledged Purna Das as Baul Samrat in 1967
1958 (circa) Baul Shiromoni for Baul Samrat's troupe, Allahabad Sangit Conference
1952 (circa) Baul Ratno for Baul Samrat's troupe, Banaras Sangit Sanmelan
1945 (circa) Gold Medal for Baul Samrat's troupe, Gandhinagar Cong. Adhiveshan (Jaipur)

References

External links
www.BabuKishan.org
www.BaulSamrat.in
Baularchive.com

Baul Philosophy

1933 births
Bengali singers
20th-century Indian male actors
Indian male folk singers
Living people
Singers from Kolkata
Recipients of the Padma Shri in arts
20th-century Indian singers
21st-century Indian singers
20th-century Indian male singers
21st-century Indian male singers
Writers about music